is a Japanese video game designer. He has helped found a number of notable video game companies and develops games at Route24, his own private limited company. The number 24 in the title comes from its founder's name: "Ni" (2) and "Shi" (4).

Career
Kenichi Nishi previously worked for both Telenet Japan and its subsidiary Riot. He was later hired by Square as a field designer for two of its larger releases. After leaving Square in 1995, Nishi helped establish Love-de-Lic, Inc. with many of his former Square coworkers. There, he designed two of the small company's three game releases: Moon: Remix RPG Adventure and L.O.L.: Lack of Love. He also helped design and write the script for the 1999 Polygon Magic title Incredible Crisis. Nishi then co-founded skip Ltd., a second-party developer for Nintendo. Acting as vice president of the company, he also directed GiFTPiA and co-directed Chibi-Robo!. Shortly thereafter, he left skip and founded Route24 on February 23, 2006. According to Nishi, he felt that working on large projects with a large group of people such as those at skip limited his freedom in designing games.

At Route24, Nishi and a staff of four other people developed LOL for the Nintendo DS, which was published by skip in 2007. He recently worked on Newtonica and Newtonica2 for the iPhone and iPod Touch with Kenji Eno, among other independently developed mobile games. In 2010, Nishi expressed interest in developing a sequel to Moon: Remix RPG Adventure, asking fans to voice their support via Twitter.

Personal life
Nishi lives in Meguro, Tokyo. He is a fan of British rock music and once had a dog named Tao, who Nishi featured as a character in many of his games including Moon: Remix RPG Adventure, GiFTPiA, L.O.L.: Lack of Love, Chibi-Robo and Captain Rainbow. Tao died in October 2009 due to kidney complications.  It is said that Dragon Quest III is Nishi's favorite game.

Credits
Tenshi no Uta (1991)
Exile (1991)
Psycho Dream (1992)
Chrono Trigger (1995)
Super Mario RPG (1996)
Moon: Remix RPG Adventure (1997)
Incredible Crisis (1999)
L.O.L.: Lack of Love (2000)
GiFTPiA (2003)
Chibi-Robo! (2005)
LOL (2007)
Captain Rainbow (2008)
Newtonica (2008)
Takurou Morinaga DS (2008)
Newtonica2 (2008)
Wacky World of Sports (2009)
PostPet DS (2009)
iCLK (2010)
geotrion (2010)
Followars (2010)
Paper Mario: Sticker Star (2012) - special thanks
"Cobits" (2013)
Pixel Game Maker Series Puzzle Pedestrians (2021)

References

External links
Route24 Official Blog 
Kenichi Nishi's blog at Studio Voice Online 
Kenichi Nishi's dual blog with Kenji Eno 

1967 births
Japanese video game designers
Living people
People from Tokyo
Square Enix people